Tutelina is a genus of jumping spiders that was first described by Eugène Louis Simon in 1901.

Species
 it contains six species, found in Ecuador, Guyana, Canada, and the United States:
Tutelina elegans (Hentz, 1846) (type) – USA
Tutelina formicaria (Emerton, 1891) – USA
Tutelina harti (Emerton, 1891) – USA, Canada
Tutelina purpurina Mello-Leitão, 1948 – Guyana
Tutelina rosenbergi Simon, 1901 – Ecuador
Tutelina similis (Banks, 1895) – USA, Canada

References

External links
 Picture of T. similis
 Picture of T. elegans

Salticidae
Salticidae genera
Spiders of North America
Spiders of South America